Trezzano Rosa (local ) is a comune (municipality) in the Province of Milan in the Italian region Lombardy, located about  northeast of Milan.

Trezzano Rosa borders the following municipalities: Busnago, Roncello, Grezzago, Basiano, Pozzo d'Adda.

Demographic evolution

References

External links
 www.comune.trezzanorosa.mi.it/

Cities and towns in Lombardy